Steptoe Battlefield State Park Heritage Site, formerly named Steptoe Battlefield State Park, is a  heritage site on the southeast side of Rosalia in Whitman County, Washington. The state park memorializes a running battle that occurred in 1858, the Battle of Pine Creek, between American soldiers under the command of Lt. Col. Edward Steptoe and a large band of Spokane, Palouse, and Coeur d'Alene Native Americans. Interpretive signage at the park describes the course of the battle.

Park history
In 1914, the Daughters of the American Revolution, Esther Reed Chapter, erected a stone monument near the location where the Steptoe troops took their final stand. The site of the monument became a state park in 1950. It was added to the National Register of Historic Places in 1976. In 2014, the park received the designation of "state park heritage site."

References

External links
Steptoe Battlefield State Park Heritage Site Washington State Parks and Recreation Commission 
Steptoe Battlefield State Park Heritage Site Brochure Washington State Parks and Recreation Commission

State parks of Washington (state)
Parks in Whitman County, Washington
Protected areas established in 1950
1950 establishments in Washington (state)